Raster-Noton was a German electronic music record label. It was established in 1999 in Chemnitz, Germany. It emerged from the fusion of Rastermusik, founded by Olaf Bender and Frank Bretschneider in 1996, and Noton (Archiv für Ton und Nichtton), a sub label that was run by Carsten Nicolai. In 2017, the label split into two entities: Raster, to be run by Bender, and Noton, focusing on Nicolai's output.

"raster-noton. archiv für ton und nichtton" is meant to be a platform — a network covering the overlapping border areas of pop, art, and science. It realizes music projects, publications, and installation works. A common idea behind all releases is an experimental approach — an amalgamation of sound, art, and design, which is apparent in the music and visible from the artwork and cover design.

The collective label's aesthetic focuses on rhythmic, minimal electronic music alternating between playful pop and introspection.

Artists

Catalogue

20' to 2000

20' to 2000 is a monthly series of twelve CDs released over the course of 1999, with each month's artist contributing a 20-minute project expressing "possibly a manifest of the millennium".  Each disc was packaged in a thin plastic slipcase with a hollow core. A separate kit containing twelve magnets fit into the core and allowed the individual discs to be joined into one set (pictured). This series received the "Golden Nica" award from Ars Electronica in 2000.

References

External links
 Official Site
 Music guide to Raster-Noton by pontone.pl

Record labels established in 1996
German independent record labels
Electronic music record labels
Ambient music record labels
Techno record labels